Baruipur High School (BHS) is a government high school for boys, located in Baruipur, West Bengal, India. This is a boys' only school for secondary and higher secondary level students. It is one of the deemed schools in Kolkata. The campus includes a fairly large play-ground and the school offers variety of extracurricular activities for its students.

History 
The school was established in 1858 by British just after the year of the historical Sepoy Mutiny. The School is one of ancient school in West Bengal. BHS is a famous school in South Kolkata and West Bengal and over centuries has produced many recognised people in different fields.

Academics 
Baruipur High School is affiliated with the West Bengal Board of Secondary Education (WBBSE) and West Bengal Council of Higher Secondary Education(WBCHSE). The school offers a common curriculum up to Grade 10, along with the option of National & Regional languages. In Grade 11 and Grade 12, the school requires students to choose one of three five-subject streams: Science (with Computer Science or Biology), Commerce, or Arts.

Notable alumni 

 Jyotirmay Bhattacharya – Former Chief Justice, Calcutta High Court
 Subhankar Chattopadhyay – Director, Scriptwriter, Content creator, and Producer

References

See also 

 List of schools in Kolkata
 List of schools in West Bengal

Boys' schools in India
Schools in West Bengal
High schools and secondary schools in Kolkata
Educational institutions established in 1858
1858 establishments in British India